Eucamptognathus badeni is a species of ground beetle in the subfamily Pterostichinae. It was described by Jules Putzeys in 1877.

References

Eucamptognathus
Beetles described in 1877